Marlo Thomas & Friends: Thanks & Giving All Year Long is an album of songs and spoken-word selections by entertainment personalities  and others, and is intended as a companion to the anthology book of the same name.
All proceeds are to benefit the St. Jude Children's Research Hospital. In 2006, Thanks & Giving All Year Long received the Grammy Award for Best Spoken Word Album for Children.

Track listing
 All Kinds of People - Sheryl Crow 
 The Mouse, the Bird and the Sausage - David Hyde Pierce
 I Want It! - Uncle Kracker & Marlo Thomas  
 Teeny Meany - James Earl Jones & Marlo Thomas  
 An Attitude of Gratitude - Jimmy Buffett  
 A Different Aladdin - Billy Crystal  
 A Smile Connects Us - Kermit the Frog  
 The Thing About Generosity - Marlo Thomas    
 Unsung Heroes - Wayne Brady  
 Josie's First Allowance Day - Rosie Perez  
 The Little Stuff - Marlo Thomas 
 The Nothingest Girl in the World - Sarah Jessica Parker  
 (I'll Give) Anything But Up! - Hilary Duff 
 Point of View - Robin Williams  
 You Know My Brother (He's So Heavy) - The Bacon Brothers  
 Cheesybreadville. - Antonio Banderas 
 Snow, Aldo - Jennifer Aniston
 Sing Me the Story of Your Day - Faith Hill  
 A Tale of Two Friends - Bert, Ernie & Marlo Thomas  
 Thank Someone - Amy Grant & John Hiatt

Charity albums
2004 compilation albums
Grammy Award for Best Spoken Word Album for Children
Atlantic Records albums
Kid Rhino albums
Children's albums